Liu Yin may refer to:

Liu Yan (Bosheng) (died 23 AD), rebel leader against the Xin dynasty, name also romanized as Liu Yin
Liu Yin (Han Zhao) (died 329), Imperial prince of the Han Zhao state
Liu Yin (Southern Han) (874–911), Late Tang Dynasty official and older brother of the founder of the Southern Han kingdom
Liu Rushi (Liu Yin; 1618–1664)), Ming Dynasty Chinese courtesan
Liu Yin (curler) (born 1981), Chinese curler
Liu Yin (swimmer) (born 1984), Chinese swimmer
Liu Yin (speed skater) (born 1989), speed skater